Arrigo Menicocci (5 October 1933 – 1 December 1956) was an Italian rower. He competed in the men's eight event at the 1956 Summer Olympics. He was killed in a road accident while at the Olympics in Melbourne.

References

External links
 

1933 births
1956 deaths
Italian male rowers
Olympic rowers of Italy
Rowers at the 1956 Summer Olympics
Rowers from Rome
Road incident deaths in Victoria (Australia)
Olympic deaths